Adrián Sipos (born 8 March 1990) is a Hungarian handball player for Telekom Veszprém and the Hungarian national team.

Career

Club
Adrián Sipos started playing at the NB II Szombathelyi Tanárképző SE. He spent almost four years in the association in Szombathely, from where he joined the leading club of the country, MKB Veszprém, with a big leap in 2008, led by the former federal captain Sándor Kaló, a legend from Veszprém, who condemned him immediately after the trial. he spent two years there. As he was not interested in the twenty-year-old player at home in a leading club he would have liked to go to, he moved to Romania, where he played in the first division for three and a half years in the strong middle team CSM Bacău, then two and a half in Székelyudvarhelyi KC. The former won two championship silver medals and made his debut in the EHF Cup, and the latter won the third place in 2015 after beating British Cambridge HC, Luxembourg's Red Boys Differdange, Ukraine's ZTR Zaporizhia, Portugal's Benfica and ABC Braga in the final, European Cup series, the Challenge Cup. He returned to Hungary in 2016 and became a player of NB I Grundfos Tatabánya KC. In 2019, he was voted the best Hungarian defensive player by the Hungarian Handball Association. In April 2020, Grundfos Tatabánya KC announced that it had extended its contract until 2023. He did not fulfill his contract: in the summer of 2021 he signed a 2-year contract with the Telekom Veszprém team.

National team
He was noticed by the national team after he returned to Hungary in 2016. Xavi Sabaté, who led the Hungarian national ensemble in 2016 and 2017, invited him to the cohesion in December 2016, which did not turn out well because his ankles went out during the first training session. Ljubomir Vranjes first made it into the adult national team and made his debut against Austria in April 2018 in the team preparing for the World Cup qualifier against Slovenia. He represented Hungary at the 2019 World Men's Handball Championship, 2020 European Men's Handball Championship and 2021 World Championship (5th place, 6 matches / 3 goals).

Honours

Club
CSM Bacău
Liga Națională
 : 2012, 2013

Székelyudvarhelyi KC
EHF Challenge Cup
 : 2015

Grundfos Tatabánya KC
Nemzeti Bajnokság I
 : 2017, 2018, 2019, 2021''
Magyar Kupa
 : 2017

Telekom Veszprém
Magyar Kupa
 : 2022
SEHA League
 : 2021

Individual
 Hungarian Best Defensive Player Of The Year: 2019

Career statistics

References

External links

1990 births
Living people
Hungarian male handball players
Sportspeople from Szombathely
Expatriate handball players
Hungarian expatriate sportspeople in Romania
Veszprém KC players